Pyrohy may refer to

 Pyrih (pl. pyrohy), a kind of  Ukrainian  pie
 Pierogi, boiled dumplings with a variety of fillings, called pyrohy by Western Ukrainians
 Pyrohiv, a village south of Kyiv